Publix may refer to:

Publix, a supermarket chain based in Lakeland, Florida
Publix Theatres, the name of the movie theater chain once owned by Paramount Pictures
Publix Theatre, former theatre building in Boston, Massachusetts

See also
Publics